Sucleia is a village in the Slobozia District of Transnistria, Moldova. It has since 1990 been administered as a part of the breakaway Transnistrian Moldovan Republic.

References

Villages of Transnistria
Slobozia District